Olwyn Enright (born 1 July 1974) is a former Irish Fine Gael politician who served as a Teachta Dála (TD) for the Laois–Offaly constituency from 2002 to 2011.

Early life and education
Born in Birr, County Offaly, she is the daughter of Tom Enright, who served as a Fine Gael TD and Senator for over thirty years until his retirement in 2002. She was educated in St. Brendan's Community School, Birr, and University College Dublin, where she graduated with a Bachelor of Civil Law degree in 1995. She attended the Law Society of Ireland in Blackhall Place, Dublin, qualifying as a solicitor in 1999.

Political career
Enright served on Offaly County Council between 1999 and 2002. She was first elected to Dáil Éireann at the 2002 general election, becoming the first female TD to represent the Laois–Offaly constituency. Within her first few weeks in the Dáil she was appointed Fine Gael Spokesperson for Education and Science.

In July 2005, Enright married Joe McHugh, who was then a Fine Gael Senator. In the 2007 general election, McHugh was elected to the Dáil to represent the Donegal North-East constituency. Enright retained her seat in Laois–Offaly, making them the third married couple to be elected to sit in the same Dáil.

Enright served as party Spokesperson on Social and Family Affairs from 2007 to 2010. In June 2010, she supported Richard Bruton's leadership challenge to Enda Kenny. Following Kenny's victory in a motion of confidence, Enright was not reappointed to the front bench.

Retirement from politics
On 30 August 2010, while pregnant with her second child, Enright announced that she would not seek to retain her seat at the next election, citing pressures of juggling her family life and career. After 9 years of service, she retired with a once off lump sum payment of €129,800 and an annual pension of €22,542.

See also
Families in the Oireachtas

References

 

1974 births
Living people
Alumni of University College Dublin
Fine Gael TDs
Local councillors in County Offaly
Irish solicitors
Members of the 29th Dáil
Members of the 30th Dáil
21st-century women Teachtaí Dála
People from Birr, County Offaly
Spouses of Irish politicians
Young Fine Gael